Siddhartha Nuni is an Indian film director and cinematographer based in Mumbai, India.

Early life 
Siddhartha attended high school at Sainik School, Korukonda and graduated in Electrical Engineering from Indian Institute of Technology Madras. He learnt cinematography at Mindscreen Film Institute, Chennai run by the Indian cinematographer Rajiv Menon. Siddhartha graduated with a Master of Arts degree from Viewfinder Erasmus Mundus European Joint Masters in Cinematography '19.

Career 
Siddhartha started his career working on travel documentaries for Mahindra Holidays . He worked in the on-set visual effects crew for Life of Pi, in 2010. He has worked on films and documentaries across various genres and languages for the past 13 years.

Filmography

Awards & Nominations

Recognition 
Siddhartha was featured in the India Today magazine as one of 37 young Indians making a difference in their field of work in 2013.

Personal 
Siddhartha currently lives in Mumbai, India.

References

External links 
 
 
 Official Vimeo Channel

1983 births
Living people